Mountains of the Central African Republic.

Mountains

References 

Central African Republic
list
Central African Republic
Mountains